Asterolepis dipterocarpi is a species of moth of the family Tortricidae. It is found in Brunei. The habitat consists of dipterocarp forests.

The wingspan is about 12 mm. The ground colour of the forewings is silver white, preserved in the form of interfasciae, sprinkled with brownish along the middle. There are some concolorous dots on the fasciae costally and larger marks at the end of the median cell. The fasciae are vivid green. The hindwings are whitish.

Etymology
The species name refers to the type of forest at the type locality.

References

Moths described in 2012
Tortricini
Moths of Asia